Daeseong-dong (also called Tae Sung Dong, Jayu-ui Maeul and Daeseongdong-gil) is a village in South Korea close to the North Korean border. It lies within the Korean Demilitarized Zone (DMZ). The village is about 1.6 kilometers (1 mile) south of the Bridge of No Return, and 12 km (7.5 miles) from the city of Kaesong, North Korea. , the village has 193 inhabitants.

Location
Daeseong-dong belongs administratively to Josan-ri, Gunnae-myeon, in Paju. It is the only civilian habitation within the southern portion of the DMZ. Only individuals who lived in the village before the Korean War, or are descendants of those who did, are allowed to move to the village.

Daeseong-dong is only  from Kijong-dong, a village in North Korea's portion of the DMZ. Here Korea's division is starkly apparent: rival national flags can be seen on gigantic flagpoles that have been erected in the two villages.

While the southern half of the DMZ is under the administration of the United Nations Command, the residents of Daesong-dong are considered South Korean civilians, and subject to South Korean laws. These residents have some unique benefits and restrictions. For example, they have the same rights to vote and receive education, but are exempt from national defense duties and taxation. Residents are also allocated large plots of land and have some of the highest farming income in the nation. However, they are subject to limitations. The safety of the villagers is paramount, since North Korean soldiers can cross and have crossed the border. Visitors invited to the village must apply for a military escort two weeks in advance. There is a curfew and headcount at 23:00 local time.

Economy

Farming is the primary economic activity of the village, particularly bags of rice sold with a DMZ brand.

Flagpoles
In the 1980s, the South Korean government built a  flagpole in Daeseong-dong, which flies a South Korean flag weighing . It flies a  flag of North Korea.

Elementary school
The village also has a small elementary school, Daeseong-dong Elementary School. The school, once slated for closure due to the changing demographics of the village, in 2011 educated a total of thirty children from grades K-6, with a waiting list to get in due to the funding and attention it receives from the South Korean government. As of 2017, only 10 of the students live in the village.

See also
Korean Demilitarized Zone

References

External links

Korean Demilitarized Zone
Paju
Villages in South Korea